The United Nations Society of Writers is a club for United Nations staff registered with the United Nations Staff Socio Cultural Commission in Geneva, and is known under the acronyms UNSW and SENU, corresponding to Societé des écrivains des Nations Unies. It was founded in Geneva on Friday 14 August 1989 by Sergio Chaves (Argentina), Leonor Sampaio (Brazil) and Alfred de Zayas (United States).

Overview

The UNSW organizes literary events, poetry readings, round tables and publishes a yearly literary journal, Ex Tempore, with a print run of 500 copies. As of December 2016, twenty-seven issues have appeared. The name Ex Tempore was chosen since staff contributions should be crisp, impromptu, and as far away as possible from the stale UN jargon of resolutions and reports.

Volume 21 (December 2010) is devoted to "music, the international language" and comprises 104 pages. Volume 22 is dedicated to the 300th anniversary of the birth of Jean-Jacques Rousseau. Volume 23 is dedicated to the human right to peace. Volume 24 covers the bicentennials of Verdi and Wagner, the trans-frontier exhibition "art en campagne", cows, swans, the environment—and love. Volume 25 is the anniversary issue, spanning 184 pages and covers the activities of UN staffers on behalf of peace. Volume 26 is dedicated to the environment, COP21 and the Sustainable Development Goals; vol. 27 is dedicated to the metaphysics of language and communication, the origin of poetry since Gilgamesh and Homer; volume 28 addresses the concept of happiness in the light of the UN-declared international day of happiness, also deals with music and creativity.

The journal Ex Tempore has been widely acclaimed in the Swiss press and received media attention from the Tribune de Geneve (9 April 1997, "Les internationaux lancent un Salon littéraire", p. 12, 4 March 1998, p. 11 "l'Onu en poésie", 12 February 2000, 28 February 2001 "Ex Tempore a tenu sa soirée littéraire", 12 February 2004 "Le Cerce de poètes qui libère les onusiens", Le Courrier 18 June 1998, "Une revue cherche à tisser des liens entre l'ONU et la cité", 10 February 2000 "littérature" p. 11, Le Journal de Genève, Le Temps, and DIVA International (2006 Nr. 2, p. 36). UN Special April 2008, p. 33: "Ex Tempore- Nouveau Numéro et Soirée Littéraire". Its members have been interviewed by local television stations such as Leman Bleu, and by local radio stations, including Radio Cité.  The journal has its own issn number:  and is kept by some 20 libraries worldwide, including the Library of Congress, the Deutsche Nationalbibliothek in Leipzig and the Schweizerisches Landesbilbiothek in Bern. On 5 October 2008 Ex Tempore hosted the Mahmoud Darwish memorial lecture during which poems of the Palestinian poet were read out in Arabic, English and French. On 25 January 2013 UNSW held its 17th annual salon, attended by 65 UN writers. On 24 January 2014 the 18th annual salon was held, attended by 62 UN staffers, on 23 January 2015 the 19th salon, on 22 January 2016 the 20th salon, on 20 January 2017 the 21st salon; the 22nd salon on 26 January 2018.  The 23rd salon is scheduled on 25 January 2019.   On 27 September 2019 the United Nations Library celebrated an event "Express and De-Stress" to commemorate 30 years of the UNSW and 30 years of publishing its literary journal Ex Tempore.  The 24th salon was held on 24 January 2020 with 48 in the audience and 15 readers in English, French, German, Latin, Russian, Spanish and Vietnamese.

The April issue of "International Diplomat", a magazine published in Geneva, Switzerland, published a 2-page article "30 Years United Nations Society of Writers", by the Society's founder, who wrote: "Among the authors of the first hour I want to thank Claude Citon, who contributed an essay “Satori” for volume one and has written for Ex Tempore ever since and Aline Dedeyan, whose short story “the day of the tenth year” graced the pages of volume one and whose clever plays have appeared in many subsequent volumes of Ex Tempore. Over the years many UNSW members contributed drawings and photos, notably Martin Andrysek, whose artwork was much appreciated by the readership. Soon we felt the need to give our authors the opportunity to express themselves in public, and started convening ad hoc poetry readings, sometimes in the UN theatre room XIV but also in rooms VIII and IX of the Palais des Nations. Since January 1997 we have held a literary salon at the “Villa des Crêts”, attended annually by 40 to 70 literature lovers. On occasion we have held summer or autumn events in the garden, e.g. to celebrate the 20th and 25th anniversaries of Ex Tempore or to commemorate the passing away of Mahmoud Darwish, a dear poet. We have also assembled in the Press Bar – for old times sake....Synergies are always important for authors. UNSW has gradually built solid cooperation with PEN International Centre Suisse romand, the Société genevoise des écrivains, the Société vaudoise des écrivains, and the Association des écrivains valaisains. We have exhibited volumes of Ex Tempore at the Salon du livre de Genève in Palexpo, not only on the UN stand but also on the stand of PEN International itself! Our literary venture was accompanied by the conviction that UN staffers had a vocation to promote peace through understanding, to build bridges between peoples and cultures. We felt inspired by the Purposes and Principles of the UN Charter, notably the promotion of human rights for all, and the commitment to save succeeding generations from the scourge of war. We shared and continue to share the spirit of the UNESCO Constitution and of civil society initiatives, including the 1921 Charter of PEN and its emphasis on the responsibility of authors to put literature in the service of peace and to defend the Voltairean principle of freedom of expression and tolerance toward dissenting views. UNSW continues to advocate international solidarity in and through our cultural diversity, and would like to be seen as a herald of democracy. Over the centuries many authors and musicians have shared this vision of universal peace, e.g. Immanuel Kant in his famous essay on Perpetual Peace, Hugo von Hofmannsthal and Richard Strauss, who founded the Salzburger Festspiele in 1920 (one hundred years ago!!!) to consecrate music and drama to the task of unifying nations and cultures, expressing the ineffable in music – that highest aesthetic form and vital principle of humanity’s striving for transcendence." (pp. 48-49) 
Volume 31 of Ex Tempore was published in December 2020 and it contains essays, short stories and poetry concerning Coronavirus, confinement, lockdown and the saving grace of literature. vol 32 came out in December 2021, containing articles and poetry by 28 authors in all six UN languages.
The most recent number is Vol. 33, which came out in December 2022, 156 pages in all 6 UN languages plus German, Latin and Hebrew.  The issue is dedicated in part to peace in Ukraine, expressed in essays and short stories.

Board

After 15 years as president of the UN Society of Writers, Alfred de Zayas retired in December 2005, but remains as editor of the literary journal. Following the General Assembly of UNSW held by Skype on 11 November 2020, the composition of the new UNSW Board is:

 President Marko Stanovic
 Vice-president: Carla Edelenbos
 Secretary: Amos Wama Taporaie
 Treasurer: Ivaylo Petrov
 Editor-in-chief: Alfred de Zayas

Honorary President:  Tatiana Valovaya, Director-General of the United Nations Office at Geneva (UNOG)

The new internet domain for the UNSW journal "Ex Tempore" www.extempore.ch is now operational.

volume 30 of the literary journal "Ex Tempore" was issued in December 2019 (180 pages).

The March 2017 issue of UN Special published an article by the Society's president and editor-in-chief on the history of the Society of Writers. /The April 2006 issue of UN Special brings an article including a Rilke translation "Célébration des lettres" (https://web.archive.org/web/20110929175900/http://www.unspecial.org/UNS650/t52.html).  The January 2009 UN Special (11,000 copies) brings an essay UN Society of Writers welcomes 2009 written by de Zayas and elaborating on the vocation of UN staffers, in particularly writers, to work for peace and universal understanding.
https://web.archive.org/web/20150512041310/http://www.unspecial.org/UNS680/t24.html
DIVA International, a Geneva quarterly, published in its number 2/2010 the article by Johannes van Aggelen "Celebrating Cultural Diversity - Ex Tempore at 20", pp. 32–33.
The UN Special announced the publication of Vol. 21 of Ex Tempore, dedicated to Music as an international language, in an article: "Le Numéro XXI d'Ex Tempore est tiré; il faut le lire" U.N.Special, février 2011, p. 10. The June 2011 issue of UN Special reproduces an article from Ex Tempore XXI on pages 14/15.  The April 2013 issue of UN Special reproduces an essay from Ex Tempore XXIII. 
Diva International publishes on the 18th Ex Tempore Salon of 24 January 2014 and the publication of Ex Tempore volume XXIV 
Diva International and UN Special both published on the Library event of 14 October 2014 to celebrate 25 years of UN writers.  The WHO publication "New Special", with a circulation of 10,500 copies, published a two-page article "Happy Anniversary" to mark 30 years UNSW (pages 40–41).  The February 2021 issue of the "New Special" pp. 28–29 published an article by UNSW president Marko Stanovic, celebrating the publication of Ex Tempore Nr. 31 and including some articles by UNSW authors on the topic "literature in confinement"..  UNSW held a literary tea event on 25 June 2022.
On 27 January 2023 the 25th annual Ex Tempore Salon was held with contributions by 25 UNSW members. An article in the March issue of the UN Staff magazine New Special is devoted to this salon and to women writers of UNSW.  www.newspecial.org  p. 16

References 

Writers' organizations
United Nations officials
Organizations established in 1989